Biatec was the name of a person, presumably a king, who appeared on the Celtic coins minted by the Boii in Bratislava (the capital of Slovakia) in the 1st century BC. The word Biatec (or Biatex) is also used as the name of those coins. In the literature, they are also sometimes referred to as "hexadrachms of the Bratislava type". Biatecs, in fact hexadrachms and tetradrachms made of high quality silver and gold, bear inscriptions in capital Latin letters. Among 14 different inscriptions (for example NONNOS, DEVIL, BUSU, BUSSUMARUS, TITTO), BIATEC appears most frequently. The inscriptions represent the oldest known use of writing in Slovakia and the neighboring territories. The coins have a diameter of 25 millimeters and a weight of 16.5-17 grams. The obverse usually shows various depictions of a head or a pair of heads. The reverse usually shows a horseman, but various mythological and real animals also occur.

References

Celtic warriors
Gaulish rulers
Silver coins
Ancient Slovakia
Boii